The Plainsong and Medieval Music Society (PMMS), also spelled as the Plainsong and Mediæval Music Society, is an English music society. Founded in 1888, the PMMS primarily researches, promotes and produces publications on medieval music, particularly the liturgical chant from that time to the present. A registered charity since 1987, it has been particularly influential in encouraging the revival of Anglican chant. Musicologists associated with the PMMS include H. B. Briggs, Anselm Hughes, G. H. Palmer, and George Ratcliffe Woodward, and more recently Gustave Reese, D. H. Turner, John Stevens and Christopher Page.

The society is best known for its publications, which number over a hundred; most of them are either essays on, or editions of, plainchant. Through Cambridge University Press, it publishes the journal Plainsong and Medieval Music twice a year, previously known as the Journal of the Plainsong & Mediaeval Music Society.

History
The Plainsong and Medieval Music Society (PMMS) was founded in London in November 1888 to promote the study of medieval music and plainchant in general. This is recounted in a March 1889 issue of The Musical Times:

An early 1896 PMMS publication gives the President as the 'Bishop of Salisbury', which would have been John Wordsworth at the time. The Vice-Presidents listed included several musicians and clergymen, including the Bishop of Argyll and The Isles (Alexander Chinnery-Haldane), Hickman Beckett Bacon, Frederick Bridge, Edward John Hopkins, George Martin, Henry Fleetwood Sheppard, John Stainer and Arthur Sullivan, among others. The honorary secretary from the founding until 1901 was H. B. Briggs. Among the society's many council members at the time were W. J. Birkbeck, Arthur Henry Brown, Somers Clarke, Walter Frere, John Thomas Micklethwaite, George Herbert Palmer, Athelstan Riley, Charles Francis Abdy Williams and George Ratcliffe Woodward. The PMMS began with a choir, which lasted a few decades.

The society was an important step for the growing late 19th-century interest in singing Gregorian chant in the vernacular. It was thus influential in encouraging the development of Anglican chant. Since 27 August 1987, the PMMS has been a registered charity with the Charity Commission for England and Wales; its charity number is 297147.

The musicologist Anselm Hughes was a major figure of the society; he was secretary from 1926 until 1974. Among the more recent academics associated with the PMMS are Gustave Reese, D. H. Turner, Frank Llewellyn Harrison, John Stevens, Christopher Page and John Harper. The society is currently led by a team of Officers, Executive Trustees, Advisory Trustees and Honorary Officers; chief among these are the Officers: the Chair Helen Deeming of Royal Holloway, University of London, the Secretary Thomas Schmidt of University of Huddersfield, and the Treasurer Christian Thomas Leitmeir of Magdalen College, Oxford.

Publications
Since its inception, the society has aimed to be a central resource its disciplines, publishing facsimile manuscripts, translating non-English documents, and creating a comprehensive catalogue of all pre-Reformation plainsong and measured music composed in England. Its chief objective has always been academic scholarship, for which it is best known. By the mid-20th century, the PMMS had published around 70 items, split between plainsong essays and editions of plainsong. Among the more notable publications was a partial translation of Peter Wagner's Einführung in die gregorianischen Melodien, Frere's Graduale Sarisburiense (1892–1894), the Antiphonale Sarisburiense (1901–1924), the Bibliotheca Musico-Liturgica (1894–1901) catalogue, Early English Harmony by Harry Ellis Wooldridge and Hughes, an Old Hall Manuscript edition, Worcester Mediaeval Harmony by Hughes and Polyphonia Sacra by Van den Borren.

Selected publications

 
 
 
 
  Originally published in German as Einführung in die gregorianischen Melodien.

Plainsong and Medieval Music

The PMMS publishes the academic journal Plainsong and Medieval Music (PMM; or Plainsong & Medieval Music) twice a year. It is published by Cambridge University Press, with a scope that covers medieval music, and plainchant from the Middle Ages to the present. Renamed in 1992, it is a continuation of the Journal of the Plainsong & Mediaeval Music Society (1978–1990). The journal consists of new scholarship, book reviews and both an annual bibliography and discography concerning chant-related publications and recordings. Its current editors are Catherine A. Bradley of the University of Ohio and Daniel J. DiCenso of the College of the Holy Cross.

The more frequently cited articles of the journal include:

References

Citations

Sources

Further reading

External links 
 
 
 Plainsong and Medieval Music journal
 Customary as amended on 26 April 2008

1888 establishments in the United Kingdom
Learned societies of the United Kingdom
Text publication societies
Music-related professional associations
Anglican church music
Music education organizations
Music education in the United Kingdom